Lloyds is an unincorporated community in Mobile County, Alabama, United States.

Notes

Unincorporated communities in Mobile County, Alabama
Unincorporated communities in Alabama